Something Good Is Going to Happen to You is an album by Baboon, released in 2002 on Last Beat Records.

Track listing

Personnel
 Steven Barnett - drums, keyboards, fan-blade guitar, e-bow bass, room evacuator (R.E.1), piano, organ, author and sole-performer ("Too Handsome to Die")
 Andrew Huffstetler - lead vocals
 Mark Hughes - bass, backing vocals, keyboards
 Michael Rudnicki - electric and acoustic guitars, backing vocals, keyboards
 Sean Kirkpatrick - piano (on "Goodnight, Good-bye")
 Regina Chellaw - trumpet (on "Goodnight, Good-bye")
 John Congleton - producer, engineer
 Rob Wechsler - mastering
 Chris Paluska - design and layout
 Todd Ramsell - design and layout

External links

2002 albums
Baboon (band) albums
Albums produced by John Congleton